Bank of Ningbo Co., Ltd. is a Chinese city-based commercial bank headquartered in Ningbo, Zhejiang. As at 31 December 2015, The company had 30 branches (each branches itself managed several locations as ) in several cities in Yangtze River Delta area, in Ningbo, Shanghai, Nanjing, Hangzhou, Suzhou, Wuxi and other cities in Zhejiang Province (such as Wenzhou), as well as in Beijing and Shenzhen.

Since January 2008, Bank of Ningbo has become one of the constituents in Shenzhen Stock Exchange Component Index (originally top 40 companies, now top 500 companies). As at 11 November 2016 Bank of Ningbo is a constituent of SZSE 100 Index and CSI 100 Index.

History
It was founded in 1997 as the Ningbo Commercial Bank. In 2007, it changed its name to Bank of Ningbo and listed its shares on the Shenzhen Stock Exchange. In 2006, Singapore's OCBC Bank took a 12.2% stake in Bank of Ningbo.

In August 2008, the bank relocated several major departments from Ningbo to Shanghai.

References

External links
 

Companies listed on the Shenzhen Stock Exchange
Companies in the CSI 100 Index
Economy in Ningbo
Companies based in Ningbo
Banks of China
Companies owned by the provincial government of China
Banks established in 1997